Sir Edmund Filmer, 9th Baronet (11 July 1835 – 17 December 1886) was an English Conservative Party politician.

He was elected to the House of Commons at the 1859 general election as a member of parliament (MP) for West Kent. The seat had previously been held by his father, the 8th Baronet from 1838 until his death in 1857, but that 9th Baronet's tenure was shorter since he did not defend his seat at the next general election, 1865. He was appointed Sheriff of Kent for 1870.

Fifteen years later, Filmer returned to Parliament when he was elected at the 1880 general election as MP for Mid Kent. However he resigned his seat in 1884, by taking the Chiltern Hundreds.

Sir Edmund was married to Mary Georgina Filmer (née Cecil, 1838–1903), an early proponent of photomontage.

Arms

References

External links
 

1835 births
1886 deaths
Baronets in the Baronetage of England
Conservative Party (UK) MPs for English constituencies
UK MPs 1859–1865
UK MPs 1880–1885
High Sheriffs of Kent